"Old Church Choir" is the second single from Christian rock artist Zach Williams from his debut studio album Chain Breaker. The song peaked at No. 1 on the Hot Christian Songs for one week. The song is his second Christian Airplay No. 1. The song clocked its nineteenth week on the Christian Airplay chart, tying Brandon Heath's "Give Me Your Eyes" from 2008. The song failed to break the record, being dethroned the following week by Tenth Avenue North's "Control (Somehow You Want Me)".

Music video
The official music video was released on May 1, 2017 on Zach Williams' Vevo channel.

The video for “Old Church Choir” was filmed just outside of Nashville and was filled with extras who came from all across the country to be part of it.

Track listing

Charts

Weekly charts

Year-end charts

Decade-end charts

Certifications

References 

2016 singles
2016 songs
Essential Records (Christian) singles
Songs written by Ethan Hulse